Monique Merrill (born May 26, 1969) is an American world champion adventure racer, ski mountaineer and marathon mountain biker. She studied at the University of Virginia.

Merrill attended the Pine Crest School until 1987, and studied at the University of Virginia until 1991. She lives in Crested Butte, Colorado.

Selected results 

 Six-time champion and record holder for Imperial Challenge Multisport, Breckenridge
 Three-time champion and record holder, Co-ed Grand Traverse-Crested Butte to Aspen ski race
 1999:
 1st, Montezuma's Revenge Mountain Bike 24 Hour Race
 2000:
 1st, Montezuma's Revenge Mountain Bike 24 Hour Race
 2003:
 1st, Xterra National Overall, Keystone
 1st, Montezuma's Revenge Mountain Bike 24 Hour Race
 2005:
 1st, Life-Link Ski Mountaineering Series
 2006:
 1st, World Championship Adventure Racing, Sweden
 1st, Primal Quest Adventure Race, Utah
 1st, Raid Galouise, Alberta, Canada
 3rd, Xterra National Championships, Colorado
 10th, World Championship vertical race
 2007:
 1st, World Championship Adventure Racing, Scotland
 1st, North American Randonnee Rally, Jackson Hole
 1st, 100 Mile Mountain Bike Marathon, Breckenridge
 1st, Mountain Crest Marathon 27.2 miles, Breckenridge
 2009:
 1st, US Ski Mountaineering National Championship, Jackson Hole
 2010:
 7th, World Championship team race (together with Amy Fulywer)
 9th, World Championship single race
 9th, World Championship vertical race
 9th, World Championship combination ranking
 2011:
 1st, Power of Four, Aspen Mountain, mixed team, together with Mike Kloser

Pierra Menta 

 2009: 7th, together with Sari Anderson

Patrouille des Glaciers 

 2010: 7th (and 4th in the "international civilian women" ranking), together with Lyndsay Meyer and Nina Cook Silitch

References

External links 
 Monique Merrill at skimountaineers.org

1969 births
Living people
American female ski mountaineers
Marathon mountain bikers
University of Virginia alumni
People from Breckenridge, Colorado
American mountain bikers
American female cyclists
21st-century American women